Zalim Jalia was a Koli king of Dahewan in Gujarat. He was a close aide to the Cambay State ruler. In order to restore structure in Bharuch State's territory, he attacked the towns Petlad and Jambhusar at the request of Nawab Momin Khan.

In 1756, Jambusar town was subordinated to Faujdar Ganesh Appa under the Peshwa government of the Maratha Empire. Afterwards, Nawab Momin Khan asked Thakor for help. The forces of Thakor and Nawab attacked Jambusar together and plundered the Maratha there for five days.

In 1772, the Diwan Lallubhai of the state of Cambay joined with the British Army and ousted Nawab Momin Khan. Nawab went on to visit the Rajput ruler of Amod but was banished, until Thakor Zalim Jaliya offered protection to the Nawab. On 24 September 1773, Thakor attempted to establish rule over Bharuch, but was unsuccessful.

In 1778, the relationship between Baroda and Britain was weakening. The British government sent the British Army and captured the Maharaja of Baroda, Fatehsinhrao Gaikwad. When the army passed through the Dahewan territory of Thakor Zalim Jalia, Thakor attacked the army, forcing the British government to send its 400 skilled soldiers to defend them.

References 

Koli people
18th-century monarchs in Asia